José Javier Gómez (born 18 March 1974) is a Spanish racing cyclist. He rode in three editions of the Tour de France, two editions of the Giro d'Italia, and to editions of the Vuelta a España.

Major results
1997
 10th Clásica de Almería
2000
 4th Overall Tour du Limousin
 6th Overall Route du Sud
2001
 6th Subida al Naranco
 6th Subida a Urkiola
2004
 5th Overall Vuelta a Asturias
2007
 5th Overall Clásica Internacional de Alcobendas

Grand Tour general classification results timeline

References

External links
 

1974 births
Living people
Spanish male cyclists
Place of birth missing (living people)
Sportspeople from the Province of Segovia
Cyclists from Castile and León